BYO Split Series Volume V is a split album released in 2004 as the fifth entry in BYO Records BYO Split Series. The album features 12 songs from the two punk bands, Alkaline Trio and One Man Army. Unlike the earlier entries in the BYO Split Series, there is only one cover song ("Wait for the Blackout") originally performed by The Damned. The other eleven tracks are brand new.

This album features the first version of Alkaline Trio's "Sadie" which was written about the Manson Family member Susan Atkins.

Track listing

References

External links
BYO Split Series Volume V on BYO Records

BYO Split Series
2004 albums
Alkaline Trio albums
One Man Army (band) albums